An aire d'attraction d'une ville (or AAV, literally meaning "catchment area of a city") is a statistical area used by France's national statistics office INSEE since 2020, officially translated as functional area in English by INSEE, which consists of a densely populated urban agglomeration and the surrounding exurbs, towns and intervening rural areas that are socioeconomically tied to the central urban agglomeration, as measured by commuting patterns. INSEE's functional area (AAV) is therefore akin to what is most often called metropolitan area in English.

Definition
INSEE's AAV follows the same definition as the Functional Urban Area (FUA) used by Eurostat and the OECD, and the AAVs are thus strictly comparable to the FUAs. Before 2020, INSEE used another metropolitan statistical area, the aire urbaine (AU), which was defined differently than the AAV, but the AU has now been discontinued and replaced with the AAV in order to facilitate international comparisons with Eurostat's FUAs.

The functional area is a grouping of communes comprising a 'population and employment centre' (pôle de population et d'emploi in French), which Eurostat calls "city" or "greater city" (depending on the FUA), defined according to population and employment criteria, and an outlying 'commuting zone' (couronne in French), which Eurostats calls "commuting zone" in English, like INSEE, but zone de navettage in French (unlike INSEE which calls it couronne), in which at least 15% of the working population work in the population and employment centre.

List of functional areas (AAV)
The following is a list of the thirty five largest functional areas (AAV) in France, based on their population at the 2020 census. Population at the 2008 and 1990 censuses is indicated for comparison.

See also
 List of metropolitan areas in Europe by population
 Larger Urban Zone
 Demographics of France
 Unité urbaine, a different statistical concept developed by INSEE, measuring contiguously built-up areas

Notes

References

Populated places in France
 
Demographics of France
Subdivisions of France
INSEE concepts